Robert McLaren was a Scottish footballer who played as a forward, primarily for Heart of Midlothian. He joined the Edinburgh club in 1892 and was a fringe player in his first two seasons. He is then documented as having moved to Celtic in April 1894, but appears to have made no competitive appearances for the Glasgow side and returned to Hearts a few months later.

He then became an important member of the team at Tynecastle Park, featuring regularly as Hearts won the Scottish Football League championship in 1894–95 and 1896–97, took part in the 1895 'World Championship' match (McLaren scored twice in a 5–3 defeat to Sunderland) and lifted the Scottish Cup in 1896; he was also involved in minor competition wins: three Rosebery Charity Cups, two East of Scotland Shields and three Edinburgh Football Leagues. However he had fallen out of favour and played his last game for the club by the time they won the Scottish Cup again in 1901, with any further career in football not widely known (he is not the same man as the defender who played for clubs including Airdrieonians in the same era).

References

Year of birth missing
19th-century births
Year of death missing
20th-century births
Scottish footballers
Association football forwards
Heart of Midlothian F.C. players
Celtic F.C. players
Scottish Football League players